The 2015 European Judo Championships were organised by the European Judo Union. Initially it was planned that championships will be held in Glasgow, Scotland, from 9 to 12 April 2015. On 21 February 2015, it was announced that competition would be held in Baku, Azerbaijan, during the 2015 European Games. The individual contests took place on 25–27 June 2015.

The Organizing Committee announced on 4 April 2014 that visually impaired judo will be included as a medal event. This will make the European Games the first continental games to "fully integrate" a Para-sport discipline into its sports programme.

Medal overview

Men's events

Women's events

Medal table

Participating nations

References

External links
 
 European Judo Union website
 event page on AllSportDB.com
 Results
 Team results

 
 
European Judo Championships
Judo at the European Games
Judo
European Games
2015 in Azerbaijani sport
Sports competitions in Baku
International sports competitions hosted by Azerbaijan
European 2015
2010s in Baku
June 2015 sports events in Europe